Aces Back to Back is a compact disc featuring a compilation of songs by Bobby Darin plus a DVD containing archival video of Darin. The set was compiled and released in 2004 by Hyena Records in an agreement with the Bobby Darin estate 31 years after Darin's death. According to producer Joel Dorn, "The title says it all. It’s aces back to back, all left hooks and no filler.”

The first seven of the selections were recorded live during Dean Martin Presents: The Bobby Darin Amusement Company, a 1972 television show, and The Bobby Darin Show in 1973. Two songs, "If I Were a Carpenter" and "Simple Song of Freedom", were from an unreleased live recording in 1969. Two songs were culled from Darin's Big Sur sessions.

Rounding out the compilation are Darin's "milk recordings," a collection of songs featured on a radio show sponsored by the American Dairy Association in the 1960s.

Track listing

References

Bobby Darin albums
2004 albums
Albums produced by Joel Dorn
Compilation albums published posthumously